Eric N. Blomgren (16 March 1893 – 3 February 1971) was a Swedish speed skater who competed in the 1924 Winter Olympics.

In 1924 he finished eleventh in the 500 metres event and twelfth in the 5000 metres event.

External links
 Speed skating 1924 

1893 births
1971 deaths
Swedish male speed skaters
Olympic speed skaters of Sweden
Speed skaters at the 1924 Winter Olympics
20th-century Swedish people